Chalav Yisrael, also pronounced cholov Yisroel, refers to kosher milk whose milking was observed by an observant Jew. The halakha of chalav Yisrael, which originates in the Mishnah and Talmud, was instituted to ensure that no non-Jew would mix milk of a non-kosher animal with the kosher milk. Today, many kosher-keeping Jews rely on the ruling of Rav Moshe Feinstein, who argues that since countries such as the United States have strict laws against mixing milks, it can be assumed that the milk is kosher.

Background
According to Jewish law (halakha), milk is only considered kosher if it derives from a kosher species of animal—in regards to milk, this primarily covers cows, goats, and sheep. Milk from a non-kosher species, such as horses and camels, is inherently non-kosher.

Institution of chalav Yisrael requirement
By the time of the rabbis of the Mishnah (Tannaim), Chazal (the Jewish sages) instituted an injunction against any milk whose milking was not done by, or under the supervision of, a Torah-observant Israelite. The prohibition, which is listed in the Mishnah tractate titled Avodah Zarah, allows for benefit to be derived from such milk, while drinking it is forbidden out of fear that a non-kosher animal's milk was mixed into the kosher milk. Milk milked by a non-Jew came to be known as "chalav akum," which literally translates directly to "milk of a non-Jew," and milk that was properly milked in accordance with the law is known as "chalav Yisrael, literally "Jewish milk." Traditional Ashkenazi pronunciation of the Hebrew is "cholov Yisroel."

This concept was later carried on to Avodah Zarah section in the Talmud during the Amoraic age. Located on page 35b, the discussion regarding chalav Yisrael milk debates whether or not it is halakhically necessary for the stringency as there are factors that give away if milk came from a non-kosher animal. However, all of the possible permissibilities have issues themselves, leading the Talmud to make no change to the law.

Chalav Yisrael milk was first codified in Maimonides's Mishneh Torah, which agrees that the prohibition is logical. The Shulchan Aruch, Rabbi Joseph Karo's widely accepted code of halakha, was the next, doing so in its Yoreh De'ah section. Modern chalav Yisrael milk is overseen by a mashgiach, or kosher supervisor, who is required to be present at the beginning of the milking but does not need to be there constantly for the whole time. Mashgichim are also responsible for ensuring that there is no opportunity for the milk to become non–chalav Yisrael at any point before it leaves the facility.

Chalav Yisrael comes into question regarding kosher cheese production, for, according to Chazal, non-kosher animals' milk cannot be used to make cheese scientifically. Therefore, as noted by the Star-K kosher certification, there are those who eat non–chalav Yisrael cheese while still only drinking chalav Yisrael milk. This position is also noted in the Mishneh Torah, but the Rambam does not necessarily allow for it due to the sages' further prohibition of cheese of a non-Jew (gevinat akum).

Chalav stam

The term chalav stam, literally translated as "plain milk," refers to milk that can be trusted to be kosher even if a Jew did not personally witness its milking with their own eyes. Its most famous allowance came in Rav Moshe Feinstein's Igros Moshe, where he permitted the leniency in areas where one can rely on the local laws, which prohibit the mixing of milks that the law chalav Yisrael intends to avoid. In this case, the idea is that knowing that there is no mixing is the same thing, halachically, as seeing that there was no cross-contamination of milks. Rav Moshe's ruling, specifically referring to the United States, is also accepted in European Union countries, among others, by the Orthodox Union hashgacha, but it is not to be accepted in countries where such laws are laxly enforced.

Many Jews, however, including Rav Moshe himself, prefer to only use chalav Yisrael milk in the stricter sense—when a Jew actually saw it. Included in this is the hasidic Chabad   movement, which argues that, particularly when chalav Yisrael is readily available, there are negative spiritual ramifications of consuming non–chalav Yisrael food. In more recent years, it has become more and more common for Orthodox Jews to request chalav Yisrael.

For those who require chalav Yisrael, there is a disagreement over whether or not food cooked on equipment that is clean but previously used non–chalav Yisrael product can be eaten.

References

Kosher dairy
Hebrew words and phrases in Jewish law
Milk